Christophe Auguin, (born 10 December 1959 in Granville, Manche), is a French yachtsman. He is the only one sailor to have won three single-handled sailing races around the globe: the BOC Challenge twice (1990-1991 and 1994-1995) and the Vendée Globe (1996-1997).

He also won the Solitaire du Figaro in 1986.

Notes

References 
 

French male sailors (sport)
1996 Vendee Globe sailors
French Vendee Globe sailors
Vendée Globe finishers
Single-handed circumnavigating sailors
1959 births
Living people